The 2019–20 season was a FC Noah's 2nd season in Armenian Premier League, and first since they changed their name from Artsakh FC. They finished the season in 2nd place, behind Ararat-Armenia who they beat in the Armenian Cup final, earning qualification to the UEFA Europa League for the first time.

Season events
On 5 December 2019, Benik Hovhannisyan extended his contract with FC Noah.

On 12 March 2020, the Football Federation of Armenia announced that all Armenian Premier League games had been postponed until 23 March, and that the Armenian Cup Semifinal second legs had also been postponed due to the COVID-19 pandemic.

Squad

Out on loan

Transfers

In

Loans in

Loans out

Released

Friendlies

Competitions

Premier League

Regular season

Results summary

Results

Table

Championship round

Results summary

Results

Table

Armenian Cup

Final

Statistics

Appearances and goals

|-
|colspan="16"|Players away on loan:
|-
|colspan="16"|Players who left Noah during the season:

|}

Goal scorers

Clean sheets

Disciplinary Record

References

FC Noah seasons
Noah